is a railway station in Nishi-ku, Nagoya, Aichi Prefecture, Japan.

Lines

 (Station number: T04)

Layout

Platforms

On Platform 1, door 18 is closest to the elevator, and on Platform 2, door 3 is closest to the elevator.  There are two wickets, the East Wicket and the West Wicket.

References

External links 
 

Railway stations in Japan opened in 1981
Railway stations in Aichi Prefecture